Administrative subdivision of Congress Poland

It was created in 1816 from the Siedlce Department.

Its capital was in Siedlce.

References
 Geographical Dictionary of the Kingdom of Poland

Voivodeships of the Congress Poland
History of Lesser Poland
1816 establishments in Europe